Gérard I of Durbuy (1223 – after 1298), was the Count of Durbuy from 1247 to his death. He was the second son of Waleran III of Limburg and Ermesinda of Luxembourg.

He married Mechthilde, daughter of Thierry of Cleves, Lord of Dinslaken, and Elisabeth of Brabant before 1259.

They had the following issue:

 Ermesinde (d. 1272), married to Gerhard V, Count of Blankenheim (d. after 1309)
 Catherine (d. September 26, 1328), married to 1) Albert, Lord of Voorne (d. 1287) and 2) Wolfart of Borsselen (d. 1289)
 Agnes
 Mary
 Mathilda, Lady of Melin, married to Henin of Fontaine-l'Évêque
 Pentecosta, married to William of Mortagne, Lord of Rumes (1268, d. 1302)
 Isabella, Lady of Roussy, married to Henry II of Grandpré Lord of Houffalize and Livry
 Margret (d. 1291), married to John II Lord of Ghistelles (d. 1315).
Gérard was the last count of Durbuy, the position transitioning to Emperor Henry VII after his death.

External links
www.genealogie-mittelalter.de
Medieval Lands Project, Herren von Blankenheim

13th-century Luxembourgian people
House of Luxembourg
1223 births
Year of death uncertain